"Istream" may refer to:

Enfilade (Xanadu)#Types of enfilades in Xanadu
C++ Standard Library#Streams and input/output